Moron Hydor (meaning 'foolish waters') was a port town of ancient Lycia, located 30 stadia from Posidarisus, and 50 stadia from Cape Hieron and Chelidonia.

Its site is located near Gümrük in Asiatic Turkey.

References

Populated places in ancient Lycia
Former populated places in Turkey